The Venerable Charles Estcourt Boucher (1856–1940)  was an eminent  Anglican priest in the late 19th and early 20th centuries.

Boucher was born on 8 June 1856 at Cheddleton and educated at Uppingham and Trinity Hall, Cambridge.

He was ordained in 1879 and began his career as Curate at Northam, Devon after which he was Rector of Frolesworth, Lutterworth and Master of Chief Baron Smith's Almshouses from 1886 to 1923.  An Honorary Canon of Peterborough from 1912 until 1937, he became the first Archdeacon of Loughborough in 1921.

Notes

1856 births
People from Cheddleton
People educated at Uppingham School
Alumni of Trinity Hall, Cambridge
Archdeacons of Loughborough
1940 deaths
Clergy from Staffordshire